Andrew Yang campaign endorsements may refer to:
 List of Andrew Yang 2020 presidential campaign endorsements
 List of Andrew Yang 2021 New York City mayoral campaign endorsements